František Ladislav Chleborád (24 November 1839 – 20 July 1911) was a Czech political economist and a pioneer of cooperatives.

Biography
Born in Habry in Bohemia, part of the Austrian Empire, he graduated Staroměstské gymnázium (Old Town Grammar School) in Prague and went on to study law and political economy.

Being fluent in Bulgarian, Russian, German, Serbian or French, Chleborád travelled the world and became an honorary consul of the Republic of Venezuela. He held many posts during his active career, including the chairman of the Brno Sokol, and leadership roles in financial institutions and banks.

Chleborád was prominent for founding the worker's cooperatives, named Oul (19th century Czech for beehive), encouraging workers to unite and to be educated. The organization was inspired by the ideas of Schulze-Delitzsch. The Czech mutual aid movement then spread outside of Prague and was also established in Brno and Liberec.

He taught political economy at the University of Prague, writing influential textbooks, arguing for nationalist socialism. He was academically active at around the financial crisis of 1873.

In 1888, Chleborád emigrated to the Russian Empire, where he became the government's adviser on matters Slavic and financial. He died in St. Petersburg in 1911.

Works
Chleborád wrote many treatises on political economy, published in newspapers (such as Dělník and Dělnické Listy) and even wrote a poetic work on saints Cyril and Methodius:

 Boj o majetek (1884)
 Hospodářství vlastenecké (1868)
 Pomoc chudým dělníkům (1868)
 Soustava národního hospodářství politického (1869)
 Věštcové slávy. K oslavení tisícileté památky prvosvětitelů Slovanů sv. Cyrilla a Methoděje (1888) (poetry)

See also
Credit union

Further reading

References

1839 births
1911 deaths
Cooperatives in Europe
Cooperative organizers
20th-century Romanian economists
Bohemian economists
People from Havlíčkův Brod District
Academic staff of Charles University